Agylloides asurella is a moth of the  subfamily Arctiinae. It was described by Strand in 1912. It is found in Ghana and Togo.

References

Moths described in 1912
Lithosiini
Fauna of Togo
Moths of Africa